The Battle of Lebanon occurred July 5, 1863, in Lebanon, Kentucky, during Morgan's Raid in the American Civil War. Confederate troops under Brig. Gen. John Hunt Morgan fought for six hours to overcome the small Union garrison before moving northward, eventually riding through Kentucky, Indiana, and much of Ohio before surrendering.

General Morgan and his 2,460 handpicked Confederate cavalrymen rode west from Sparta in middle Tennessee on June 11, 1863, intending to divert the attention of the Union Army of the Ohio from Southern forces in the state. On June 23, the Federal Army of the Cumberland began its operations against Gen. Braxton Bragg's Confederate Army of Tennessee in what became known as the Tullahoma Campaign, and Morgan decided to move northward. Morgan crossed the rain-swollen Cumberland River by July 2 at Burkesville, Kentucky. After being defeated by Michigan troops along the Green River at the Battle of Tebbs' Bend on July 4, Morgan withdrew and circled to the west, hoping to reach Louisville, then lightly defended.

Morgan surprised and captured the Federal garrison at Lebanon. With minimal time to prepare, Union Lt. Col. Charles S. Hanson (a brother of Confederate general Roger Hanson) quickly deployed his 350 - 400 men from the 20th Kentucky Infantry behind overturned wagons, hastily erected barricades, fences, and other cover. Arriving at the town, Morgan formally requested that Hanson surrender, an offer that was refused. With a huge numerical advantage, Morgan quickly pushed Hanson's advance pickets back through the town's streets. He trapped many of the Union soldiers in the Louisville and Nashville Railroad depot, but the well fortified brick building provided considerable protection. Morgan ordered nearby buildings set on fire, hoping to force Hanson to surrender. In a sharp six-hour fight, Federal troops killed Morgan's 19-year-old brother, Lt. Thomas Morgan, during the final charge. General Morgan finally captured and paroled the enemy soldiers. His men burned the offices of the Circuit Clerk and County Clerk, as well as 20 other buildings.

See also
 List of battles fought in Kentucky

Notes

References
 Duke, Basil Wilson, A History of Morgan's Cavalry. Cincinnati, Ohio: Miami Printing and Pub. Co., 1867. On-line version
 Horwitz, Lester V., The Longest Raid of the Civil War. Cincinnati, Ohio: Farmcourt Publishing, Inc., 1999. .
Mowery, David L., Morgan's Great Raid: The Remarkable Expedition from Kentucky to Ohio. Charleston, SC: History Press, 2013. .

External links
 Trails-R-Us: The Death of Tom Morgan

Lebanon
Lebanon
Lebanon, Kentucky
Lebanon
Lebanon
1863 in Kentucky
Lebanon
July 1863 events